Maike Beer (born 7 June 1996 in Hamburg) is a German curler.

Teams

References

External links

Living people
1996 births
Sportspeople from Hamburg
German female curlers

Competitors at the 2017 Winter Universiade